Archbishop Temple Church of England High School  is a voluntary aided Church of England secondary school, situated in the city of Preston in Lancashire, England. The Headteacher is Ivan Catlow. It has 782 pupils and 48 teachers.

History
Archbishop Temple Church of England High School welcomed its first pupils in September 1963, as a secondary modern school serving the needs of inner city Preston. It was originally named "William Temple School", after Archbishop William Temple, Archbishop of Canterbury 1940-1944.

Academic performance and inspections

In 2013 97% of pupils left the school with A*-C grades in Maths at GCSE. In 2019 83% of pupils left the school with five or more good GCSE qualifications including English and Maths. Archbishop Temple Church of England High School is the highest performing (non selective) school in Lancashire.

Ofsted rated the school as Outstanding in 2009; however since then the school through its lack of effective leadership and governance has moved from being the most highly rated school in Preston to a school Requiring Improvement.  The most recent inspection in September 2022 indicates that the school now Requires Improvement and will need to be re-visited in the next 30 months to ensure the school improves.

Ofsted visited the Maths department in 2010 and rated it as Outstanding.

In 2015 the school became a Teaching School, working within the Preston Teaching School Alliance. In 2009 the school became a National Support School, and again in 2017 the school was redesignated as a National Support School, and the Headteacher became a National Leader of Education.

See also

Listed buildings in Preston, Lancashire

References

External links
 Archbishop Temple School School website
 Ofsted report - Ofsted's September 2022 inspection - Requires Improvement
 Ofsted report - Ofsted's October 2009 inspection - Outstanding
 Faith inspection - a Diocese of Blackburn report on the school, November 2005

Schools in Preston
Secondary schools in Lancashire
Educational institutions established in 1963
1963 establishments in England
Church of England secondary schools in the Diocese of Blackburn
Voluntary aided schools in England